is a Japanese voice actor and singer from Tokyo, Japan who is affiliated with With Line.

Biography

Personal life
Before he became a voice actor, he was training at a vocal school for aspiring voice actors. He trained at AMG (Amusement Media Gakuin) for about two years before he made his official debut and was signed to his current agency.

Originally, he never intended to become a voice actor, he used to study in a regular university, but during the time he was in university he helped one of his upperclassmen with their acting troupe, he stepped in from time to time and realized that he found acting fun. Though he didn’t really enjoy doing it in front of people so that’s why he decided he wanted to become a voice actor instead because in that way he didn’t have to act in front of people.

Though Toki aspired as a child to become a voice actor one day he never took it further until after he graduated from university. He enjoyed anime, manga, and games ever since a young age, so he always admired voice actors himself.

Toki grew up in a family that was very interested in music, especially his father who was one of Toki’s earliest influences. His father used to take him to a bar where he could sing and that’s when Toki realized his love for singing and music. He was still a child back then. As well as his father playing a lot of foreign artists, Toki grew up listening to music from all over the world, which exposed him to the English language at an early age. You can hear some of this influence in Toki’s mini-album that was released in September 2020, ‘’True Gazer’’. This mini-album was inspired by music from the ’60s and ’70s, packed with a lot of tunes that give that nostalgic feel, this also inspired his 2021 True Gazer Reading Live event. In this stage event, he played a character that was able to time travel to the time where his parents were teenagers, within certain scenes, he would perform songs from his mini-album that fit the scenarios from the act.

Even if Toki never liked being on stage in front of people, he has shown various times later in his career that he is a very good talker, which later led him to get the role of the MC in various events. Though Toki has a past of appearing a bit awkward during events, especially when he is singing, he has grown into a splendid performer who is still eager to learn new things.

Career
Affiliated with voice actor talent agency WITH LINE. He made his debut as a voice actor in 2013 at the age of 24.

During his rookie days he didn’t get too many roles, nor were they big roles. He voiced a few background characters/passerbyers in anime series such as Uta no Prince-sama, etc. One of his first big roles was Growth’s leader Eto Koki from the Tsukipro franchise (SQ/ALIVE series), with this role he could use one of his strongest points as a voice actor; his singing voice.

His debut single The Promised Overture (Yakusoku no Overture/約束のOverture) released on May 15th, 2019. The song was the ending theme of the Spring 2019 anime Midnight Occult Civil Servants. The song was inspired by Latin American pop music to fit the character he portrayed in the anime. It was meant to be a catchy tune that could easily be played on the radio and something that was memorable for an anime ending theme.

Radio
Today Toki is hosting two different radio programs of his own, the first one being called Café Tokinowa (喫茶トキノワ). He made his debut with this show in 2016. In May of 2019, his second radio show started airing, in honor of becoming a solo artist, the radio program “Time with You” made its debut. The program was brought by Pony Canyon, the record label he is signed with.

Filmography

Anime
2016
Yuri!!! on Ice – Leo de la Iglesia

2017
The Idolmaster SideM – Kei Tsuzuki
TsukiPro the Animation – Kōki Etō (Growth)

2018
Kakuriyo: Bed and Breakfast for Spirits – Ginji

2019
Demon Slayer: Kimetsu no Yaiba – Kiyoshi
Midnight Occult Civil Servants – Huehuecóyotl
Welcome to Demon School! Iruma-kun (Season 1) – Allocer Schneider

2020
Toilet-Bound Hanako-kun – Akane Aoi
A3! – Yuki Rurikawa
Monster Girl Doctor – Glenn Leitbeit
Our Last Crusade or the Rise of a New World – Jhin Syulargun

2021
WAVE!! Surfing Yappe!! (TV) – Naoya Kido
Skate-Leading Stars – Masatsugu Ajikata
Welcome to Demon School! Iruma-kun (Season 2) – Allocer Schneider
Tokyo Revengers – Kazutora Hanemiya
Fire From My Fingertips 2: My Lover is a Firefighter – Rei Hidaka
The Vampire Dies in No Time – Fukuma
Taisho Otome Fairy Tale – Hakaru Shiratori

2022
Miss Kuroitsu from the Monster Development Department – Cannon Thunderbird
Salaryman's Club – Yuho Mashiba
Requiem of the Rose King – Sir Richard Grey
Lucifer and the Biscuit Hammer – Tarō Kusakabe
Shine On! Bakumatsu Bad Boys! – Sakuya
Shoot! Goal to the Future – Subaru Kurokawa

2023
Ningen Fushin: Adventurers Who Don't Believe in Humanity Will Save the World – Zem
Flaglia – Silver
Hell's Paradise: Jigokuraku – Yamada Asaemon Kishou
The Legendary Hero Is Dead! – Touka Scott, Sion Bladan
Isekai Shōkan wa Nidome Desu – Setsu
Why Raeliana Ended Up at the Duke's Mansion – Keith Westernberg

Films
2020
WAVE!! Surfing Yappe!! – Naoya Kido
Kono Sekai no Tanoshimikata: Secret Story Film – Koichiro Someya
2022
Toku Touken Ranbu: Hanamaru ~Setsugetsuka~ – Matsui Gou

Games
2013
Fairy Fencer F – minor character
2014
The Idolmaster SideM – Kei Tsuzuki 
2015
Granblue Fantasy – Joel 
2016
Mary Skelter: Nightmares – Hitsuka 
2017
A3! – Yuki Rurikawa 
Anidol Colors – Yuito Toki 
First Lady Diaries – Hisoka Yukishiro 
2018
Piofiore no Banshou – Leo Cavagnis 
Ikemen Kakumei ◆ Alice to Koi no Mahou – Mousse Atlas 
Tsumugu Logic – Tsukasa Tsukasa 
Mary Skelter 2 – Hitsuka 
DREAM!ing – Chizuru Maki 
2019
Mahoutsukai no Yakusoku – Rutile 
Touken Ranbu – Matsui Goi 
Grimms Echoes – El 
2020
Project Sekai: Colorful Stage feat. Hatsune Miku – Rui Kamishiro 
Piofiore no Banshou -Episodio 1926- – Leo Cavagnis 
2021
Kimi wa Yukima ni Koinegau – Hibie & Hibina 
The Caligula Effect 2 – Machina 
Shuuen no Virche -Error:Salvation- – Dahut

Discography

Mini-albums

EPs

Singles

References

External links
 
 Shunichi Toki Profile at WITH LINE

1989 births
Living people
Japanese male voice actors